The hexagonal lattice (sometimes called triangular lattice) is one of the five two-dimensional Bravais lattice types. The symmetry category of the lattice is wallpaper group p6m. The primitive translation vectors of the hexagonal lattice form an angle of 120° and are of equal lengths,

 

The reciprocal lattice of the hexagonal lattice is a hexagonal lattice in reciprocal space with orientation changed by 90° and primitive lattice vectors of length

Honeycomb point set 

The honeycomb point set is a special case of the hexagonal lattice with a two-atom basis.  The centers of the hexagons of a honeycomb form a hexagonal lattice, and the honeycomb point set can be seen as the union of two offset hexagonal lattices.

In nature, carbon atoms of the two-dimensional material graphene are arranged in a honeycomb point set.

Crystal classes 
The hexagonal lattice class names, Schönflies notation, Hermann-Mauguin notation, orbifold notation, Coxeter notation, and wallpaper groups are listed in the table below.

See also
 Square lattice
Hexagonal tiling
Close-packing
Centered hexagonal number
Eisenstein integer
Voronoi diagram

References 

Lattice points
Crystal systems